Kudrino is the name of several rural localities in Russia:
Kudrino, Arkhangelsk Oblast, a village in Cheryomushskoye Rural Settlement of Kotlassky District, Arkhangelsk Oblast
Kudrino, Astrakhan Oblast, a selo in Marfinsky Selsoviet of Volodarsky District, Astrakhan Oblast